Mercado de Campo de Ourique ("Campo de Ourique Market") is a neighborhood food market located in Lisbon, Portugal.

The market originally opened in 1934. It was remodelled in 1991 and most recently in 2013 by António Maria Braga, winners of the 2019 Rafael Manzano Prize. The market includes gourmet food stalls.

See also
 Mercado de San Miguel, Madrid

References

External links
 Mercado de Campo de Ourique website 

1934 establishments in Portugal
Buildings and structures in Lisbon
Tourist attractions in Lisbon
Retail markets in Portugal
Food markets